Sidi Said, Morocco is a hamlet in Morocco located at 28° 27' 36" North, 10° 34' 12"  was during the Roman Empire one of five Castra (fort) that guarded the city of Volubilis from incursion over the nearby Limes Africanus. Sidi Said was the base for the Cohors IV Gallorum equitata, an auxiliary cavalry unit from Gaul.  Rome's control over the area ended, however, following the chaos of the Crisis of the Third Century, when the empire nearly disintegrated as a series of generals seized and lost power through civil wars, palace coups and assassinations.

the Arabs had arrived in 708. The Idrissids (786–917), established their capital at nearby Volubilis, a few kilometers north-west of Sidi Said. The city of Meknes to the south was founded by the Almoravids in the 11th century, as a military establishment and Almohads, toppled the Almoravids in 1147.

Climate
The region around Sidi Said experiences a degraded Mediterranean climate, undergoing continental influences during the summer and winter seasons. However, the geographical diversity of the region means that each of its natural areas has particular climatic nuances. The temperature of the hottest month varies between 30 °C and 45 °C, and that of the coldest month varies between 0 °C and 7 °C, but the freezing period is very strong.

References

Roman frontiers
Populated places in Meknès Prefecture
Mountain villages in Morocco
Roman fortifications in Morocco